The Newton County Schools System is a public school district in Newton County, Georgia, United States, based in Covington. It serves the communities of Covington, Mansfield, Newborn, Oxford, Porterdale, and Social Circle.

Schools

Elementary schools
East Newton Elementary School
Farview Elementary School
Flint Hill Elementary School
Heard-Mixon Elementary School
Live Oak Elementary School
Livingston Elementary School
Mansfield Elementary School
Middle Ridge Elementary School
Oak Hill Elementary School
Porterdale Elementary School
Rocky Plains Elementary School
South Salem Elementary School
West Newton Elementary School

Middle schools
Cousins Middle School
Clements Middle School
Indian Creek Middle School
Veterans Memorial Middle School
Liberty Middle School

High schools
Alcovy High School
Eastside High School
Newton High School

Academy
Newton College and Career Academy

Theme school
The Newton County Theme School at Ficquett

Alternative school
Rise Academy

Open July 28, 2017 for the 2017-2018 School year Home of The Phenix

References

External links

Education in Newton County, Georgia
School districts in Georgia (U.S. state)